Elena Lvovna Shcheglova (born 2 August 1950 in Moscow) is a Russian former figure skater who represented the Soviet Union in international competition. She is a two-time Prize of Moscow News champion and a two-time Soviet national champion. Shcheglova finished in the top ten at two World Championships and three European Championships. She placed 12th at the 1968 Winter Olympics in Grenoble, France.

Competitive highlights

References

Navigation

Russian female single skaters
Soviet female single skaters
Olympic figure skaters of the Soviet Union
Figure skaters at the 1968 Winter Olympics
1950 births
Living people
Figure skaters from Moscow